The Wang River is a river in northern Thailand.

Geography
Its waters flow from north to south. The Wang River has its source in the Phi Pan Nam Range  in Wiang Pa Pao District, Chiang Rai Province. One of the principal settlements along the river is Lampang, which is on the north bank of a curve in the river. From Lampang, the river flows southwards passing by Thoen into Tak Province. It joins the Ping River near Mae Salit, Ban Tak District, north of the town of Tak. The Ping River is a tributary of the Chao Phraya River.

Tributaries

Tributaries of the Wang include the Mo, Tui, Chang, and Soi Rivers

Wang basin
The Wang basin is part of the Greater Ping Basin and the Chao Phraya Watershed.

References

Wang
Geography of Chiang Rai province
Geography of Tak province
Geography of Lampang province